
AD 18 (XVIII) was a common year starting on Saturday (link will display the full calendar) of the Julian calendar. At the time, it was known as the Year of the Consulship of Augustus and Caesar (or, less frequently, year 771 Ab urbe condita). The denomination AD 18 for this year has been used since the early medieval period, when the Anno Domini calendar era became the prevalent method in Europe for naming years.

Events

By place

Roman Empire 
 A vexillatio (sub-unit or detachment) of Legio III Augusta is destroyed by an ambush in Africa.

Syria 
 Winter – Germanicus Caesar arrives in Syria, as new commander-in-chief for the Roman East.
 Gnaeus Calpurnius Piso, governor of Syria, ignores the order of Germanicus to send Syrian-based legions, including Legio VI Ferrata and Legio X Fretensis, to Armenia to back him in his planned coronation of Artaxias III.

Parthia 
 Germanicus concludes a peace treaty with Artabanus II of Parthia, in which he is recognized as king and friend of Rome.

China 
 After a flooding of the Yellow River in China, farmers are forced to rebel. Emperor Wang Mang reacts by sending an army (some 100,000 men) against the agrarian rebels. The rebel leaders, concerned that during battle it will become impossible to tell friend from foe, order that their men color their eyebrows red – and this is where the name Chimei ("The Red Eyebrows") comes from.

Korea 
 Daemusin becomes ruler of the Korean kingdom of Goguryeo.

India 
 In India, the Indo-Parthians control Taxila.

Births 
 Julia Livilla, daughter of Germanicus and Agrippina the Elder (approximate date) (d. AD 41)

Deaths 
 Crinagoras, Greek epigrammatist (b. 70 BC)
 Herod Archelaus, Jewish ruler (ethnarch) (b. 23 BC)
 Mother Lü, rebel leader against the Xin dynasty
 Publius Ovidius Naso, Roman poet (or AD 17)
 Yang Xiong, Chinese philosopher (b. 53 BC)
 Yuri, Korean ruler of Goguryeo

References 

0018

als:10er#18